Richards v Murgatroyd is a cited case in New Zealand regarding the enforceability of exclusion clauses.

References

Court of Appeal of New Zealand cases
New Zealand contract case law
2000 in case law
2000 in New Zealand law